Medici is an Italian-British television drama series about the Medici dynasty set in 15th-century Florence, starring Dustin Hoffman as Giovanni di Bicci de' Medici, Richard Madden as Cosimo de' Medici, and Stuart Martin as Lorenzo de' Medici (The Elder). The series was created by Frank Spotnitz and Nicholas Meyer.

Series overview

Episodes

Season 1 (2016)

Season 2 (2018)

Season 3 (2019)

References

Medici
House of Medici